The Undeniable LP is the debut album by Detroit rapper and close Slum Village affiliate Phat Kat.

It was released twice, both on Barak Records. The Detroit Edition omits the three tracks produced by Fat Ray as well as "Rainy Dayz," produced by Jake One.

Track listing
"Intro"
"Door" featuring J Dilla & Black Milk
"Dedication 2004"
"It'z a Rap" featuring Big Tone
"Shake, Shake" featuring MC Breed
"VIP In"
"Polo Shit"
"True Story"
"Destiny" featuring Melanie Rutherford
"Rainy Dayz" featuring Dwele
"Big Booties"
"Red Alert" featuring Fat Ray
"Wolfz" featuring Slum Village & Black Milk
"Club Banger"
"1000 Niggaz" featuring La Peace, Obie Trice, Loe Louis & Killa Ghanz

The Detroit Edition bonus tracks 
"All Y'all"
"Get Right"
"Who, What, Where" featuring DJ Dez

References

2004 debut albums
Phat Kat albums
Albums produced by Jake One
Albums produced by J Dilla
Albums produced by Black Milk